

Incumbents
President: Agustín Morales until November 27, Tomás Frías Ametller

Events

Births

Deaths
November 27 - Agustín Morales (shot and killed by nephew Frederico Lafaye)

 
1870s in Bolivia
Years of the 19th century in Bolivia